Rosaire Gendron (19 October 1920 – 5 July 1986) was a Liberal party member of the House of Commons of Canada. Born in Saint-François-Xavier, Quebec, he was a Chartered Accountant by career.

Gendron attended schools in Saint-François-Xavier, Sainte-Anne-de-la-Pocatiere, Saint-Victor, Lévis then Université Laval.

After an unsuccessful attempt to win the Rivière-du-Loup—Témiscouata electoral district in the 1962 federal election, he won that riding in the 1963 election. Gendron was re-elected in the 1965, 1972, 1974, 1979 and 1980 elections. He left federal politics after serving six terms from the 27th to the 32nd Canadian Parliaments.

Between 1956 and 1968 he was mayor of Rivière-du-Loup, Quebec, also serving as president of the Union of Quebec Municipalities in 1964–1965. He also served as executive vice-president for the Chamber of Commerce of Quebec at one time.

References

External links
 

1920 births
1986 deaths
Members of the House of Commons of Canada from Quebec
Liberal Party of Canada MPs
Université Laval alumni
Mayors of Rivière-du-Loup